Giorgio Girgis Sorial (born July 12, 1983) is an Italian politician from the Five Star Movement.

Biography 

Giorgio Sorial was born in Brescia, Italy, son of Egyptian Coptic parents. He grew up mostly in Brescia, and after graduating from "B. Castelli" Technical Institute he graduated in Information Engineering (BSc) at the University of Brescia with an experimental thesis on the 2002/95/EC (RoHS directive: Restriction of Hazardous Substances Directive, restriction on the use of harmful substances in processes for the production of Electrical and electronic devices). After graduation, he has worked as engineer junior  in the field of automation engineering for a few years, then he joined the International business area of the company where he worked, thanks in particular to the interpersonal and linguistic skills (in addition to the Italian he speaks fluently English, French and Arabic, the latter based to his Egyptian Coptic origins).

In 2010 he moved to Ireland where he started his post-graduate studies and in 2011 he graduated with an MBA (Master of first level in Business Administration) at The Trinity College in Dublin.

After his returns in Italy he was hired as a consultant in process and strategic management by the Irish branch of an international consulting company.

Political activities 
In 2009 he joined the Meetup local community "Beppe Grillo's friends of Brescia". In 2010 he was candidate for the regional election in Lombardy for the 5 Star Movement. At the political national elections in 2013 he was elected member of the Italian Parliament representing the Lombardy constituency for the Movement 5 Stars in the Chamber of Deputies, the lower house of the Italian Parliament. Once elected, in March 2013, Sorial became vice chairman of the Budget and Finance Committee. On May 12, 2015, he is elected vice-chairman of the parliamentary group 5 Star Movement at the Deputies Chamber and from August 5, 2015 he is the new chairman of the parliamentary group until January 2016 due to the rotation of roles rule applied within the parliamentary group.

Parliamentary activities 

Just elected he joined the only one working committee, called "special committee", being elected vice-chairman of the committee.

Until the establishment of all standing committees, when he became member of the Budget and finance committee being elected vice-chairman.

From July 19, 2013, he is also a member of the Parliamentary Committee on Childhood and Adolescence, until October 30, 2014.

Among its legislative proposals there are "Provisions on the purchase and sale of town cars or representatives dedicated cars", namely the law for the abolition of the so-called "town cars", approved by the Chamber of Deputies on 15 March 2016, and the draft law amending the law no. 243 approved on the December 24, 2012, on Balanced budget and Debt Relief for Transactions in Financial Items (2923).

He is also involved on other not-economic-financial topics, he has intervened on numerous occasions to denounce the environmental pollution in Brescia bringing a sample of hexavalent chromium contaminated water and presenting various parliamentary acts for the resolution of the Caffaro case.

Very active also in the defense of the small and medium-sized enterprises of the territory.

From August 5, 2015 until December 5, 2015 he is the chairman and spokesman of the Movement 5 Stars parliamentary group in the Chamber of Deputies.

Reference list 

1983 births
Living people
Five Star Movement politicians
University of Brescia alumni